Berenguela is a highland Aymara town. It is located in the commune of Colchane, Tarapacá Region, Chile.

References 

Populated places in Chile
Populated places in Tarapacá Region